Duke Maximilian Joseph of Bavaria (4 December 1808 – 15 November 1888), known informally as Max in Bayern, was a member of a junior branch of the royal House of Wittelsbach who were Kings of Bavaria, and a promoter of Bavarian folk-music. He is most famous today as the father of Empress Elisabeth of Austria ("Sisi") and great-grandfather of King Leopold III of Belgium.

Life
Maximilian Joseph was born at Bamberg, the only son of Duke Pius August in Bavaria (1786–1837) and his wife, Princess Amélie Louise of Arenberg (1789-1823). On 9 September 1828, at Tegernsee, Maximilian Joseph married Princess Ludovika of Bavaria, the sixth daughter of King Maximilian I Joseph of Bavaria, his father's cousin. They had ten children.

In 1834 he purchased Possenhofen Castle on Lake Starnberg; this was his major residence for the rest of his life. In 1838 he acquired Unterwittelsbach Castle (today housing a "Sisi" museum) near the site of Burg Wittelsbach, the ancestral seat of the House of Wittelsbach. Maximilian Joseph died in Munich. He and his wife are buried in the family crypt in Tegernsee Abbey, a former monastery which Ludovika's father, King Maximilian I Joseph, had  acquired in 1817. At the same time of the secularisation, Duke Maximilian Joseph's grandfather Duke Wilhelm in Bavaria had also purchased a former monastery, Banz Abbey. Both properties, Tegernsee and Banz, are still today owned by Prince Max, Duke in Bavaria.

Middle East trip
In 1838 Maximilian Joseph travelled to Egypt and Palestine.  He published an account of this trip: Wanderung nach dem Orient im Jahre 1838 (München: Georg Franz, 1839; reprinted Pfaffenhofen: Ludwig, 1978). While climbing the Great Pyramid, he arranged for his servants to yodel as if he were climbing in the Alps. He collected a number of antiquities which he brought back to Bavaria and displayed in his father's home, Banz Abbey; they can still be seen there today. Among the items are the mummy of a young woman, three mummies' heads, several animal mummies, shawabtis, and several stones from tombs or temples including one from the Temple of Dendur.  He also bought some children in the Cairo slave market and later freed them. When Maximilian Joseph was in Jerusalem, he paid for the restoration of the Church of the Flagellation on the Via Dolorosa.

Folk-music
Maximilian Joseph was one of the most prominent promoters of Bavarian folk-music in the 19th century.  Under his influence the zither started to be used in court circles and eventually became identified as the national musical instrument of Bavaria.  Because of his interest he received the nickname Zither-Maxl. He himself played the zither and also composed music for it.

During a visit by his cousin Ludwig II of Bavaria, Ludwig saw some sheet music on Maximilian Joseph's piano by the composer Richard Wagner, which led on to Ludwig's financial support for Wagner from 1863.

Maximilian Joseph's musical compositions have been collected in the work: Die im Druck erschienenen Kompositionen von Herzog Maximilian in Bayern: Ländler, Walzer, Polka, Schottisch, Mazurka, Quadrillen und Märsche für Pianoforte, Zither, Gitarre oder Streichinstrumente (München: Musikverlag Emil Katzbichler, 1992).

Issue

Honours
He received the following orders and decorations:
 : Knight of the Order of Saint Hubert
 : Grand Cross of the Grand Ducal Hessian Order of Ludwig, 26 November 1849
  Kingdom of Prussia: Knight of the Order of the Black Eagle, 20 November 1841
 : Knight of the Order of the Rue Crown, 1864
 :
 Grand Cross of the Royal Hungarian Order of Saint Stephen, 1853
 Knight of the Distinguished Order of the Golden Fleece, 1854
  Kingdom of Greece: Grand Cross of the Order of the Redeemer
 : Grand Cross of the Illustrious Royal Order of Saint Ferdinand and Merit

Ancestry

Notes

Bibliography

 Dreyer, Aloys. Herzog Maximilian in Bayern, der erlauchte Freund und Förderer des Zitherspiels und der Gebirgspoesie. München: Lindauer, 1909.
 Damien Bilteryst, Olivier Defrance, Joseph van Loon: Les Biederstein, cousins oubliés de la reine Élisabeth, années 1875-1906. Museum Dynasticum, Bruxelles, XXXIV/1 2022.

 See also parts of Furst und Arzt : Dr. med. Herzog Carl Theodor in Bayern : Schicksal zwischen Wittelsbach und Habsburg by Richard Sexau, a biography of his son Karl Theodor (Styria Verlag, Graz, 1963)

External links

1808 births
1888 deaths
19th-century German people
People from Bamberg
House of Wittelsbach
Members of the Bavarian Reichsrat
Dukes in Bavaria
German hunters
Knights of the Golden Fleece of Austria
Grand Crosses of the Order of Saint Stephen of Hungary
Great Pyramid of Giza